Ortschaft is a term in German speaking countries for a human settlement. In several states of Germany, it is also used for administrative subdivisions of municipalities. These have been defined in the Gemeindeordnung or Kommunalverfassung of the respective federal state. This is the case in the states of Baden-Württemberg, Lower Saxony, North Rhine-Westphalia, Saxony, Saxony-Anhalt and Thuringia. The Ortschaften often, but not always, coincide with former municipalities, that were incorporated into another municipality. The inhabitants of an Ortschaft are represented by an elected Ortschaftsrat (local council) and/or a Ortsvorsteher (local representative).

References

Subdivisions of Germany